Ilex tolucana is a tree species in the family Aquifoliaceae, native to the mountains of Mexico and Central America from east-central Sonora south to El Salvador.

Habitat and ecology
Ilex tolucana is a tree up to 15 m tall, found in oak forest or in mesophyllous mountain forest, frequently along stream banks. It is almost entirely glabrous with leaves entire or with a few small teeth toward the tip. Flowers are white, born in small umbels. Berries are small, red and globose.

These plants are being conserved at the El Triunfo Biosphere Reserve.

References

tolucana
Vulnerable plants
Trees of Sonora
Trees of Chihuahua (state)
Trees of Sinaloa
Trees of Durango
Trees of Jalisco
Trees of Michoacán
Trees of Oaxaca
Trees of Chiapas
Trees of Guerrero
Flora of Guatemala
Flora of Honduras
Flora of El Salvador
Taxonomy articles created by Polbot
Plants described in 1878
Flora of the Sierra Madre Occidental
Flora of the Sierra Madre del Sur
Flora of the Trans-Mexican Volcanic Belt